The National Congress of Nicaragua was the legislature of Nicaragua before the Nicaraguan Revolution of 1979.

The congress was bicameral, and consisted of Chamber of Deputies and Senate.

Presidents of the Chamber of Deputies before 1979

Presidents of the Senate before 1979

See also
National Assembly (Nicaragua) - Unicameral legislature since 1986
History of Nicaragua

References

History of Nicaragua
Defunct bicameral legislatures
Politics of Nicaragua
Political organizations based in Nicaragua
1979 disestablishments in Nicaragua